Alexei Bell Caballero (born June 18, 1990) is an amateur Cuban Greco-Roman wrestler, who played for the men's middleweight category.

Bell represented Cuba at the 2012 Summer Olympics in London, where he competed for the men's 74 kg class. Bell, however, was defeated by Provisor in their re-match during the qualification rounds of the event, with a three-set technical score (3–0, 0–1, 0–1), and a classification point score of 1–3.

References

External links
Profile – International Wrestling Database
NBC Olympics Profile

1990 births
Living people
Olympic wrestlers of Cuba
Wrestlers at the 2012 Summer Olympics
Sportspeople from Camagüey
Cuban male sport wrestlers
20th-century Cuban people
21st-century Cuban people